Karl Marx's idea that the state can be divided into three subject areas: pre-capitalist states, states in the capitalist (i.e. present) era and the state (or absence of one) in post-capitalist society. Overlaying this is the fact that his own ideas about the state changed as he grew older, differing in his early pre-communist phase, the young Marx phase which predates the unsuccessful 1848 uprisings in Europe and in his later work.

Bourgeois state 
In Marx's 1843 Critique of Hegel's Philosophy of Right, his basic conception is that the state and civil society are separate. However, he already saw some limitations to that model, arguing:

By the time he wrote The German Ideology (1846), Marx viewed the state as a creature of the bourgeois economic interest. Two years later, that idea was expounded in The Communist Manifesto:

This represents the high point of conformance of the state theory to an economic interpretation of history in which the forces of production determine peoples' production relations and their production relations determine all other relations, including the political. Although "determines" is the strong form of the claim, Marx also uses "conditions". Even "determination" is not causality and some reciprocity of action is admitted. The bourgeoisie control the economy, therefore they control the state. In this theory, the state is an instrument of class rule.

The Communist Manifesto and The German Ideology 
The Communist Manifesto was a short polemical work, but more detail on the theories concerned can be obtained by going back to The German Ideology, where Marx wrote:
The Relation of State and Law to Property
In the case of the nations which grew out of the Middle Ages, tribal property evolved through various stages — feudal landed property, corporative moveable property, capital invested in manufacture — to modern capital, determined by big industry and universal competition, i.e. pure private property, which has cast off all semblance of a communal institution and has shut out the State from any influence on the development of property. To this modern private property corresponds the modern State, which, purchased gradually by the owners of property by means of taxation, has fallen entirely into their hands through the national debt, and its existence has become wholly dependent on the commercial credit which the owners of property, the bourgeois, extend to it, as reflected in the rise and fall of State funds on the stock exchange. By the mere fact that it is a class and no longer an estate, the bourgeoisie is forced to organise itself no longer locally, but nationally, and to give a general form to its mean average interest. Through the emancipation of private property from the community, the State has become a separate entity, beside and outside civil society; but it is nothing more than the form of organisation which the bourgeois necessarily adopt both for internal and external purposes, for the mutual guarantee of their property and interests. The independence of the State is only found nowadays in those countries where the estates have not yet completely developed into classes, where the estates, done away with in more advanced countries, still have a part to play, and where there exists a mixture; countries, that is to say, in which no one section of the population can achieve dominance over the others. This is the case particularly in Germany. The most perfect example of the modern State is North America. The modern French, English and American writers all express the opinion that the State exists only for the sake of private property, so that this fact has penetrated into the consciousness of the normal man.
Economic Dependence of the State on the Bourgeoisie
With the development and accumulation of bourgeois property, i.e., with the development of commerce and industry, individuals grew richer and richer while the state fell ever more deeply into debt. This phenomenon was evident already in the first Italian commercial republics; later, since the last century, it showed itself to a marked degree in Holland, where the stock exchange speculator Pinto drew attention to it as early as 1750, and now it is again occurring in England. It is therefore obvious that as soon as the bourgeoisie has accumulated money, the state has to beg from the bourgeoisie and in the end it is actually bought up by the latter. This takes place in a period in which the bourgeoisie is still confronted by another class, and consequently the state can retain some appearance of independence in relation to both of them. Even after the state has been bought up, it still needs money and, therefore, continues to be dependent on the bourgeoisie; nevertheless, when the interests of the bourgeoisie demand it, the state can have at its disposal more funds than states which are less developed and, therefore, less burdened with debts. However, even the least developed states of Europe, those of the Holy Alliance, are inexorably approaching this fate, for they will be bought up by the bourgeoisie; then Stirner will be able to console them with the identity of private and state property, especially his own sovereign, who is trying in vain to postpone the hour when political power will be sold to the "burghers" who have become "angry".

Modifications 
By the early 1850s, political events in Europe, which he covered in articles for the New-York Daily Tribune as well as a number of more substantial pieces, were forcing Marx to modify his theory to allow considerably more autonomy for the state. By 1851, the mid-century rebellions had all given way to conservatism and the principal countries of Europe had autocratic or aristocratic governments, namely Napoleon III in France, Frederick Wilhelm IV in Germany and in England a parliament populated mainly by members of the aristocratic class, whether Whig or Conservative. Yet at the same time, the bourgeoisie had economic power in places. For Marx, this was clearly an anomalous situation and gave it considerable attention.

His solution is what Jon Elster has described as the "abdication" or "abstention" theory. It contends that the bourgeoisie found that the advantages of wielding direct power were under the circumstances outweighed by various costs and disadvantages, so they were willing to tolerate an aristocratic or despotic government as long as it did not act too detrimentally to their interests. Marx makes several points. Regarding England, he says of the bourgeoisie that "if the aristocracy is their vanishing opponent the working class is their arising enemy. They prefer to compromise with the vanishing opponent rather than to strengthen the rising enemy, to whom the future belongs".

Marx also suggests that it would be better for the bourgeoisie not to wield power directly because this would make their dominance too obvious, creating a clear target for proletarian attack. It is better to make the workers fight a "two front war" (Elster) against the aristocracy in government and the bourgeoisie in the economy. Among other things, this would make it difficult for the proletarians to form a clear conception of who was their principal enemy. Regarding France, he suggests that the bourgeoisie recognized that they had been better off under the monarchy (1830–1848) than during the brief period when they wielded power themselves (1848–1851) "since they must now confront the subjugated classes and contend against them without mediation, without the concealment afforded by the crown".

References

Sources 
 Evans, Michael (1975). Karl Marx. London.

Marxist theory
State ideologies